Cross is a French crime film written and directed by Philippe Setbon.

Synopsis 
The divorced cop Eli Cantor once brought a man called Simon Leenhardt behind bars. Leenhardt has sworn revenge to Cantor. He escapes from an insane asylum for criminals and breaks into the house where Cantor's family lives. With a team of psychopaths he takes everybody in the house as hostage. Eli feels he can't risk to ask for official help. He plans to tackle the situation discretely. Unfortunately his best friend in the police force refuses to help him. So Eli looks out for another potential partner. He comes across the adventurer Thomas Crosky who engages in illegal fights just for kicks. Together they sneak into the house. Meanwhile Leenhardt tries to make friends with Cantor's family but his manic accomplices get more and more out of control.

Cast 
Michel Sardou: Thomas Crosky ("Cross")
Roland Giraud: Eli Cantor
Patrick Bauchau: Simon Leenhardt
Marie-Anne Chazel: Catherine Crosky
Maxime Leroux: Sandro
Stéphane Jobert: Jacques Kester
Gérard Zalcberg: Georges 'Rudi' Rudicek
Arnold Boiseau: Farrel
Philippe Polet: Caïn
Jean Barney: Inspecteur
Loïc Bitout: Claire's fiancé
Louba Guertchikoff: Diane

References

External links 
 
 

1987 crime films
1987 films
Films about hostage takings
French crime films
French neo-noir films
1980s French-language films
Police detective films
1980s French films